Chris Barnes may refer to:

Chris Barnes (actor)  (born 1965), American child actor
Chris Barnes (bowler) (born 1970), American bowler
Chris Barnes (musician) (born 1967), American death metal vocalist
Chris Gorell Barnes (born 1974), English digital entrepreneur and marine conservationist

See also
Krys Barnes (born 1998), American football player
Christopher Daniel Barnes (born 1972), American actor